The Walter Pyramid, formerly known as The Long Beach Pyramid, is a 4,000-seat, indoor multi-purpose arena on the campus of Long Beach State University in Long Beach, California.

History
The Walter Pyramid was officially opened on November 30, 1994, when it hosted a Long Beach State men's basketball game against the Detroit Titans, which aired live on ESPN. A standing-room only crowd of 5,021 saw Long Beach come away victorious with a final score of 71-64.

The Walter Pyramid was designed by Don Gibbs and built by the Nielson Construction Company of San Diego. The building of Walter Pyramid cost approximately $22 million. Each side of the perimeter of Walter Pyramid measures , making it a mathematically true pyramid. It is one of only four true pyramid-style buildings in the United States, the others being the Summum Pyramid in Salt Lake City, Utah, Luxor Las Vegas in Las Vegas, Nevada, and Pyramid Arena in Memphis, Tennessee.

The Walter Pyramid rises 18 stories above the Long Beach skyline and its exterior is uniformly clad in sheets of dark-blue corrugated aluminum.

Name change
On March 5, 2005, Long Beach State officially renamed The Pyramid to Walter Pyramid in honor of Mike and Arline Walter. The Walters were given this recognition for a $2.1 million donation given to the university. In addition to being the vice-president of Levi Strauss & Co., Mike Walter was also a dean for Long Beach State's College of Business Administration from 1993 to 2000.

Tenants

University athletics
The Walter Pyramid is currently home to the Long Beach State Beach men's basketball and Long Beach State Beach women's basketball programs, as well as the Long Beach State Beach men's volleyball and Long Beach State Beach women's volleyball programs. All LBSU teams playing home games in the Walter Pyramid are nicknamed “the Beach”. The teams were previously known as the 49ers but that nickname was recently dropped. Prior to the construction of the Walter Pyramid on campus, the men's basketball team played some of their games in the Long Beach Arena in downtown Long Beach, and at the on-campus University Gymnasium later renamed Gold Mine, which has just 1,900 seats.

In addition to being the home for Long Beach State athletics, the Walter Pyramid as hosted several NCAA-sponsored events including numerous women’s volleyball NCAA matches, the 2001 and 2003 NCAA Men’s Volleyball Championships and the 2003 NCAA Women’s Volleyball Regionals.

Non-university athletics
The Southern California Summer Pro League used the Walter Pyramid during the summer months from 1995 to 2007. The league showcased current and prospective NBA basketball players, including recent draft picks, current NBA players working on their skills and conditioning, and international professionals hoping to become NBA players. The league went on hiatus for the 2008 season and announced its intention to move to Los Angeles for 2009.

The Walter Pyramid was home to the Long Beach Stingrays, a women's professional basketball team of the now-defunct American Basketball League for a time in 1997 and 1998.

The Walter Pyramid  hosts the World Brazilian Jiu-Jitsu Championships or, in Portuguese language, Mundials.

New Japan Pro-Wrestling presented the show Strong Style Evolved on March 25, 2018, which sold out within minutes.

The Los Angeles Sparks played a 2019 WNBA Playoffs semifinals game at the Walter Pyramid.

See also
 List of NCAA Division I basketball arenas

References

External links
 Walter Pyramid

American Basketball Association (2000–present) venues
College basketball venues in the United States
College volleyball venues in the United States
Basketball venues in California
Indoor arenas in California
Long Beach State Beach basketball
Buildings and structures in Long Beach, California
Sports venues completed in 1994
Pyramids in the United States
Sports venues in Long Beach, California
Skyscrapers in Long Beach, California
Skyscrapers in California
Volleyball venues in California
1994 establishments in California